Thomas Conyers (ca. 16664 October 1728) of Elemore Hall, County Durham was an English Tory politician who sat in the English House of Commons between 1695 and 1708 and in the British House of Commons from 1708 to 1727.

Early life
Conyers was the fifth son of Nicholas Conyers of Boulby, Yorkshire and the only son of his third wife  Margaret Freville, daughter of Nicholas Freville of Hardwick, county Durham. He was a cousin of John Conyers. He  matriculated at Trinity College, Oxford on 13 May 1684, aged 17, and was admitted at the Middle Temple to study law in 1686. He married, by licence dated 25 June 1690, Elizabeth Hall, the daughter and heiress of Thomas Hall of Elemore.

Political career
By the time of his marriage, Conyers had acquired property in county Durham. He did not stand at the second election of that year but was returned unopposed for Durham in the 1702 English general election. In 1704 he was appointed Equerry to Prince George of Denmark and avoided the vote for the Tack. At the 1705 English general election he topped the poll in a contest, but after he voted against the Court candidate for Speaker in 1705, he was dismissed from his post as Equerry in 1706. He was returned unopposed as MP at the 1708 British general election. There was a contest again at the 1710 British general election and he topped the poll. He was listed as one of the ‘Tory patriots’ who had opposed the continuation of the war and one of the ‘worthy patriots’ who detected the mismanagements of the previous administration. He voted  in support of the French commerce bill of 18 June 1713. At the 1713 British general election, he and his son-in-law George Baker, were both returned unopposed at Durham City. Throughout the parliaments he voted and was listed as a Tory.

Conyers and his son-in-law were returned unopposed again as MPs for Durham City at the 1715 British general election. He voted consistently against the Whig administration. At the 1722 British general election he was successful in a contest for the seat. He did not stand in 1727.

Death and legacy
Conyers died on 4 October 1728. He and his wife had one daughter Elizabeth, who inherited the Elemore estate. She married George Baker, and their son, another George, rebuilt Elemore Hall.

References

1660s births
1728 deaths
Year of birth uncertain
People from Durham, England
English MPs 1698–1700
English MPs 1701
English MPs 1702–1705
English MPs 1705–1707
Members of the Parliament of Great Britain for City of Durham
British MPs 1707–1708
British MPs 1708–1710
British MPs 1710–1713
British MPs 1713–1715
British MPs 1715–1722
British MPs 1722–1727